Palma Nicolina Ravallo, (19 May 1929 – 6 June 2012) better known as Estela Raval, was one of the first Argentine singer of pop latino back to the 1950s. She was accompanied by a band named The 5 Latinos.

Raval was the lead in the musical Excitante. In the musical she showed her talented voice, she sang in the theatre show as of the 1st cycle. She was being replaced by Spanish singer and actress Carmen Flores, sister of the late Lola Flores, for the third cycle being that Raval was battling cancer. She later returned to her place as of March. Estela Raval eventually died on 6 June 2012 in Buenos Aires.

Notably, Raval recorded a Spanish version of Édith Piaf's Hymne à l'amour.

References 

1929 births
2012 deaths
20th-century Argentine women singers
Latin Grammy Lifetime Achievement Award winners
Women in Latin music